Oikos is a monthly peer-reviewed scientific journal covering research in the field of ecology. It is published by Wiley-Blackwell on behalf of the Nordic Society Oikos.

History
The journal was established in 1949 as Oikos: Acta Oecologica Scandinavica, together with the Nordic Society Oikos, to provide a vehicle for publishing in the growing field of ecology. The journal content would have no preference with regard to taxonomic group. In the 1970s the scope was narrowed to studies with relevance to the progress of theory in ecology.

From 1949 to 1977, the journal appeared in one volume of three issues per year. From 1977 to 1987, two volumes per year were produced, and three volumes from 1987. In addition, from 1949–1975, a number of supplements were published at irregular intervals.

Per Brinck Oikos Award

Between 2007 and 2014, the subject editors made nominations for an annual award given to a world-leading ecologist. The following persons have received this awards:
2008 - Hal Caswell
2009 - 
2010 - Hanna Kokko
2011 - Michel Loreu
2012 - Tim Coulson
2013 - Sharon Strauss
2014 - Robert D. Holt

Editors-in-chief
The following persons have been editor-in-chief:
2011–present Dries Bonte, Ghent University
2010–2011 Tim Benton, Leeds
2004–2010 Per Lundberg, Lund
1989–2004 Nils Malmer, Lund
1965–1989 Per Brinck, Lund
1949–1965 Christian Overgaard Nielsen, Copenhagen

External links

Nordic Society Oikos

Ecology journals
Publications established in 1949
Monthly journals
Wiley-Blackwell academic journals
English-language journals